The 1960 United States presidential election in Massachusetts took place on November 8, 1960, as part of the 1960 United States presidential election, which was held throughout all 50 states. Voters chose 16 representatives, or electors to the Electoral College, who voted for president and vice president.

Massachusetts voted overwhelmingly for the Democratic nominee, John F. Kennedy, who was serving as the state's junior U.S. senator, over the Republican nominee, Vice President Richard Nixon of California. Kennedy ran with Senate Majority Leader Lyndon B. Johnson of Texas, while Nixon's running mate was Ambassador Henry Cabot Lodge, Jr. of Massachusetts.

Kennedy carried his home state of Massachusetts in a landslide, taking 60.22% of the vote to Nixon's 39.55%, a Democratic victory margin of 20.67%. This made it the third most Democratic state in the nation, after Rhode Island and Georgia.

As Kennedy narrowly defeated Nixon nationally to win the presidency, Massachusetts weighed in for this election as about 21% more Democratic than the national average.

Massachusetts had been a Democratic-leaning state since 1928, when the Democratic Party had nominated the first Roman Catholic nominee for president, Al Smith. While Smith lost nationally in a landslide, partially due to anti-Catholic prejudice in much of the country, he won Massachusetts due to the massive turnout and support of the many Irish Catholics in the state. In 1960, John F. Kennedy became the second Roman Catholic presidential nominee by a major party, and again his religion became an issue in some regions of the country. However, there was little doubt that Kennedy, an Irish Catholic born in Brookline, Massachusetts, would be able to carry Massachusetts in his presidential run.

Since 1928, Massachusetts had been a swing state, having voted for Democrats Franklin D. Roosevelt and Harry S. Truman in the 1930s and 1940s, but voting for Republican Dwight D. Eisenhower in both 1952 and 1956. In 1956, Eisenhower had carried the state by 19 points. The 21-point margin by which Kennedy won the Bay State 4 years later thus represented a massive 40-point swing toward the Democrats between the 1956 and 1960 elections. Kennedy’s landslide victory in 1960 finally solidified the transformation of Massachusetts into a Democratic stronghold in the modern era. For the first time in American presidential history, in 1960, a Democrat broke 60% of the vote in Massachusetts, and thus Kennedy's 60.22% was the highest percentage of the vote any Democrat had ever received in the state up to that point.

Religion was a major dividing factor in shaping the vote in 1960. Nixon's running mate, Henry Cabot Lodge, was also from Massachusetts, and had served the state as a Republican Senator, but was a Protestant, and represented traditional Protestant Yankee Republicanism in Massachusetts. Kennedy, an Irish Catholic Democrat, represented an entirely different strain of Massachusetts politics, the emerging majority coalition of urban and ethnic immigrant voters. In 1952, Kennedy had first defeated Lodge to take the latter's U.S. Senate seat, symbolizing this new Democratic coalition's rise in the state. The residual Yankee Republicanism combined with the popularity of the Republican incumbent Eisenhower allowed Nixon to take a decent 39.55% of the vote, but by 1960, the ethnic Catholic vote held a decisive majority in Massachusetts, and turnout among Catholic voters reached record highs in 1960.

Kennedy carried 9 of the state’s 14 counties, including the most heavily populated parts of the state surrounding the large cities of Boston, Worcester, and Springfield. Nixon carried only 5 counties, 3 of them island or peninsula counties. Nixon’s most significant win was Plymouth County, which he won narrowly with 51% of the vote.

Kennedy put in an historically strong performance in the state's capital and largest city, Boston, home to many Catholics of Irish and Italian immigrant heritage. In Suffolk County, where Boston is located, Kennedy won a landslide with 74.4% of the vote to Nixon’s 25%, the first time in history that a presidential candidate had received more than 70% of the vote in the county. Kennedy was also the first Democrat to carry Norfolk County since Martin van Buren in 1836.

The decisive Democratic win in 1960 would foreshadow the political direction Massachusetts would take in the years to come, as it would become one of the most Democratic states in the nation in the elections that followed. In 1964 and 1968, Democratic nominees Lyndon Johnson and Hubert Humphrey (respectively) would even outperform Kennedy, and in 1972 it would be the only state in the nation to vote for Democrat George McGovern, ultimately making it the only state that Richard Nixon never won in any of his three presidential campaigns.

The 1960 election was also the last time a candidate who declared Massachusetts as his home state won the presidency regardless of his performance in the state. The next three presidential nominees whose home state was Massachusetts, Michael Dukakis, John Kerry, and Mitt Romney, all lost their respective presidential bids.

Despite Kennedy's win, this is the last time that the towns of Amherst, Aquinnah, Belchertown, Stockbridge, and Wendell voted Republican as of 2021.

Results

Results by county

See also
 United States presidential elections in Massachusetts

References

Massachusetts
1960
1960 Massachusetts elections